The Roman theatre of Verona (Italian: Teatro Romano di Verona) is an ancient Roman theatre in Verona, northern Italy. It is not to be confused with the Roman amphitheatre known as the Verona Arena.

History
The theatre  was built in the late 1st century BC. Before its construction, two walls were built alongside the Adige River, between the Ponte di Pietra and the Ponte Postumio, to protect it against floods.

Today only remains of the edifice are visible, recovered starting from around 1830. They include the cavea and the steps, several arcades of the loggias and remains of the stage. Part of the cavea was occupied by the church of S. Siro, built in the 10th century and restored in the 14th century.

At the top of the hill there was an ancient temple, built on a series of terraces.

See also
 List of Roman theatres

External links
Page at verona.com

Buildings and structures completed in the 1st century BC
Roman sites of Veneto
Verona
Theatres in Veneto
Buildings and structures in Verona